The 1893 Newfoundland general election was held on 6 November 1893 to elect members of the 17th General Assembly of Newfoundland in Newfoundland Colony. Although the Liberals won the majority of seats, the Tory party filed petitions against 15 elected Liberals and one Independent, James Murray, alleging election irregularities. The results of those elections were set aside by the courts and the candidates were barred from seeking reelection. The Tory Party, led by Augustus F. Goodridge, temporarily holding the balance of power, formed a government in 1894. Once the resulting by-elections had been held, the Liberals regained the balance of power and formed a government led by Daniel J. Greene. Greene's government passed legislation allowing candidates who had been disqualified to seek election again. William Whiteway was subsequently reelected in a by-election in early 1895 and became Premier.

Results by party

Elected members
 Bay de Verde
 Henry J. B. Woods Liberal
 Sydney Woods Liberal, elected 1894
 George E. Moores Liberal
 John B. Ayre Tory, elected 1894
 Bonavista Bay
 Donald Morison Tory
 Alfred B. Morine Tory
 Darius Blandford Tory
 Burgeo-LaPoile
 James Murray Independent
 Henry Y. Mott Tory, elected 1894 (speaker)
 Burin
 James S. Tait Liberal
 James J. Pitman Liberal, elected 1894
 William B. Payne Liberal
 Henry Gear, Liberal, elected 1894
 Carbonear
 William Duff Liberal
 Ferryland
 Michael P. Cashin Liberal
 Daniel Joseph Greene Liberal
 Fogo
 Thomas C. Duder Tory
 Fortune Bay
 James Oliphant Fraser, Jr. Tory
 Harbour Grace
 Henry Dawe Tory
 Robert S. Munn Tory
 William Whiteway Liberal, elected 1895
 Eli Dawe Liberal
 Harbour Main
 Frank J. Morris Liberal
 William J. Woodford Liberal
 Placentia and St. Mary's
 James F. McGrath Liberal
 Richard T. McGrath Liberal, elected 1894
 George H. Emerson Liberal (speaker until 1894)
 Michael Tobin Liberal, elected 1894
 William J. S. Donnelly Tory
 John T. Dunphy Liberal, elected 1894
 Port de Grave
 Charles Dawe Tory
 St. Barbe
 Alexander A. Parsons Liberal
 St. George's
 James W. Keating Liberal
 Michael H. Carty Tory
 St. John's East
 James Patrick Fox Liberal
 John P. Fox Liberal, elected 1894
 Thomas J. Murphy Liberal
 Charles Hultan Liberal, elected 1894
 Lawrence O'Brien Furlong Tory
 St. John's West
 Edward P. Morris Liberal
 James C. Tessier Liberal
 Patrick J. Scott Liberal, elected 1894
 Maurice W. Furley Liberal
 G. J. Tessier Liberal, elected 1894
 Trinity Bay
 William Whiteway Liberal
 William H. Horwood Liberal, elected 1894
 Robert Bond Liberal
 George W. Gushue Liberal, elected 1894
 Twillingate
 Jabez P. Thompson Liberal
 Gilles Foote Liberal, elected 1894
 Augustus F. Goodridge Tory
 Michael T. Knight Liberal

References 
 

1893
1893 elections in North America
1893 elections in Canada
Pre-Confederation Newfoundland
1893 in Newfoundland
November 1893 events